The air campaign of the Heglig Crisis was a military air campaign of the Sudanese Government against the Republic of South Sudan, part of Heglig Crisis.

Conflict
The Sudanese Air Force started the bombings in the Republic of South Sudan. The campaign started on 1 March 2012, in Panykang County when a helicopter damaged two oil wells. Than a south Sudanese bomber started fire on Teshwin, but it not damaged anything. The real campaign started when Sudanese forces open the fire against Bentiu, and make 5 casualties. NATO asked Sudan to stop the campaign, but the government didn't stop it.

Note: Since Sudan does not allow journalists into conflict areas, reports of the bombings and the conflict are by-and-large reported by sources in South Sudan or those allied with the Sudan People's Liberation Army. Sudan claims that it has exclusively bombed South Sudanese military positions and denies all further allegations.

References 

Military operations involving Sudan